Moor is a ghost town in Ceder Pass in Elko County, Nevada, United States. It is located along Interstate 80 between Wells and West Wendover.

History
The first settlement at Moor was made in 1869. Variant names were "Moor Siding", "Moores", and "Moors". The community was named after a railroad employee. In 1941, Moor had 17 inhabitants.   Other than some remnants of building foundations and aged debris, little remains of the town today.

References

External links

Ghost towns in Elko County, Nevada
Ghost towns in Nevada